John Harper (29 May 1872 – 15 April 1912) was a Scottish Baptist pastor who died in the sinking of the RMS Titanic in the North Atlantic Ocean.
Harper was born in the village of Houston, Renfrewshire, Scotland, in 1872. He personally embraced his parents' Christian faith at age 14 and began preaching at 18. He supported himself in early adulthood by doing manual labor in a mill until Baptist pastor E.A. Carter of Baptist Pioneer Mission in London heard of his preaching and placed him in ministry work in Govan, Scotland. In 1897, he became the first pastor of Paisley Road Baptist Church in Glasgow, Scotland. Under his care, the church quickly grew from 25 members to over 500 and soon moved to a new location on Plantation Street. In 1923, it moved into its present building on Craigiehall Street and was renamed Harper Memorial Baptist Church in his honor.

At the time of the Titanic disaster, Harper was 39, a widower with a six-year-old daughter, Annie Jessie (Nana), and pastor of Walworth Road Baptist Church in London. He was traveling with his daughter and niece Jessie W. Leitch to Chicago to preach for several weeks at the Moody Church, where he had been guest minister the previous fall, when the ship hit an iceberg on the night of 14 April 1912, and was lost. His daughter and niece were put on a lifeboat and survived, but Harper stayed behind and jumped into the water as the ship began to sink. Some who survived told that Harper preached the Gospel to the end (especially Acts 16:31), first aboard the sinking ship and then afterward to those in the freezing water before dying in it himself.

The story of John Harper aboard the Titanic is told in the book, The Titanic's Last Hero, published by Moody Adams.

A children's version of John Harper's last days on board the Titanic was published by Christian Focus Publications in March 2011 titled 'Titanic – Ship of Dreams – John Harper' written by Robert Plant.

See also
 RMS Titanic
 Passengers of the RMS Titanic

External links
 Harper Memorial Baptist Church
 John Harper biography

References

1872 births
1912 deaths
Scottish Baptist ministers
Scottish evangelicals
Deaths on the RMS Titanic